Kaira altiventer is a species of orb weaver in the family of spiders known as Araneidae. It is found in a range from the United States to Brazil.

References

Araneidae
Articles created by Qbugbot
Spiders described in 1889